Judge Tyler may refer to:

David Gardiner Tyler (1846–1927), judge of the Virginia Circuit Court
Harold R. Tyler Jr. (1922–2005), judge of the United States District Court for the Southern District of New York
John Tyler Sr. (1747–1813), judge of the United States District Court for the District of Virginia

See also
Justice Tyler (disambiguation)